Javier Cambre -born Xavier Cambre in San Juan, Puerto Rico,  is a contemporary artist with dual citizenships from Spain and the US,  working in diverse media such as drawing, photography, collage, painting, text and sculpture. His maternal grandfather was the poet Evaristo Ribera Chevremont.

After earning with high honors an Associate Degree in Engineering, Cambre studied architecture at Universidad de Puerto Rico (B. Arch. Design, Magna Cum Laude), Columbia University and at Universidad Pontificia Bolivariana (Dipl. Arquitecto) in Colombia. In 1998 Cambre graduated from the School of the Art Institute of Chicago with a Master of Fine Arts and was awarded a fellowship at the Whitney Independent Study Program, which he decided not to pursue after moving to NYC and spending two weeks in the program. Nevertheless, 4 years later he was selected to exhibit his work in the 2002 Whitney Biennial. Cambre is  a tenured professor in the Art and Design department at Queensborough Community College, City University of New York, where he has taught since the year 2000.

Cambre has exhibited his work at the 2002 Whitney Biennial, MoMA-P.S. 1 Contemporary Art Center, the Brooklyn Museum, the Sculpture Center, the Center for Curatorial Studies at Bard College, El Museo del Barrio and the Moore Space in Miami. He has also exhibited his work in museums in Spain, Puerto Rico, Russia and Argentina. Cambre has been awarded residencies at the Headlands Center for the Arts in Sausalito, CA, and at the National Studio Program in P.S. 1/MoMA, as well as artist grants from the New York Foundation for the Arts, the National Association of Latino Arts and Culture, the New Jersey Council on the Arts  and the Research Foundation of the City University of New York. His work is in the collection of the Whitney Museum and has been discussed in publications such as the New York Times, Washington Post, New York Magazine, Tema Celeste, Sculpture Magazine, Arts Monthly, and Art Nexus 
among others.

Publications
Black Box (2016) is Cambre's first published photo book.
Vacuus Bacchus (2016) is a series of color-tinted black & white photographs which explores the relation between Eros and Nothingness.
Soundtrack (2018) Cambre's Soundtrack interplays with the structural systems of communication (spatial, graphic, musical and linguistic) and the unfolding points where they deconstruct and open up to new visual and poetic possibilities.
Chamber Music (2020) is Cambre's fourth publication, taking to a new level the explorations of his previous book, Soundtrack. Chamber Music presents works raging from photography, painting and text to architectural drawings and indeterminate music notation.

References

External links
Official site

Spanish artists
American experimental filmmakers
People from San Juan, Puerto Rico
School of the Art Institute of Chicago alumni
University of Puerto Rico alumni
Living people
American video artists
Puerto Rican sculptors
Year of birth missing (living people)